David Finfer (born June 7, 1942) is a film editor who was nominated at the 1993 Academy Award for Best Film Editing for the film The Fugitive. He shared the nomination with Dean Goodhill, Don Brochu, Richard Nord, Dov Hoenig and Dennis Virkler. The Fugitive (1993) was listed as the 39th best-edited film of all time in a 2012 survey of members of the Motion Picture Editors Guild.

David Finfer has over 40 credits since his start in 1971.

Selected filmography
A Cinderella Story: If the Shoe Fits (2016)
Teen Beach 2 (2015)
Teen Beach Movie (2013)
Geek Charming (2011)
Sharpay's Fabulous Adventure (2011)
Tooth Fairy (2010)
Infestation (2009)
Still Waiting... (2009)
The Clique (2008)
The Santa Clause 3: The Escape Clause (2006)
The Last Time (2006)
Bachelor Party Vegas (2006)
Waiting... (2005)
Connie and Carla (2004)
The Santa Clause 2 (2002)
Joe Somebody (2001)
The Ponder Heart (2001)
The Flamingo Rising (2001)
Snow Day (2000)
The Runner (1999)
Simon Birch (1998)
Kissing a Fool (1998)
Romy and Michele's High School Reunion (1997)
Fair Game (1995)
Exit to Eden (1994)
The Fugitive (1993)
Boxing Helena (1993)
Bill & Ted's Bogus Journey (1991)
Defending Your Life (1991)
Heart Condition (1990)
Warlock (1989)
Back to the Beach (1987)
Inside Out (1986)
Soul Man (1986)
Lost in America (1985)
The Sky's No Limit (1984)
I Want to Live (1983)
The Fighter (1983)
An Invasion of Privacy (1983)
The Legend of Walks Far Woman (1982)
For Ladies Only (1981)
Modern Romance (1981)
Defiance (1980)
Real Life (1979)
You've Got to Walk It Like You Talk It or You'll Lose That Beat (1971)

References

External links
 

American film editors
Living people
1942 births
Place of birth missing (living people)